It Lives Again (also known as It's Alive II) is a 1978 American science fiction horror film written, produced and directed by Larry Cohen. It is the sequel to the 1974 film It's Alive. The film stars Frederic Forrest, Kathleen Lloyd, John P. Ryan, John Marley, Andrew Duggan and Eddie Constantine. The film was released by Warner Bros. on May 10, 1978.

Plot
This film continues with Frank Davis (John P. Ryan), still reeling from the death of his child and the part he played in it, seeing his chance to atone by assisting other would-be parents of mutant children. He tries to warn soon-to-be parents Jody (Kathleen Lloyd) and Eugene Scott (Frederic Forrest) of the vast and dangerous conspiracy to murder their baby and the other unborn mutant children who are being born around the country. They are convinced when they are met by Mallory (John Marley) and a strong force of police officers at the hospital as Jody is about to go into labor. She is rescued by Frank from the maternity ward before she goes into labor. The baby is delivered in a truck specially constructed for this specific purpose. They manage to elude the people going after them.

The baby is placed with two others in a secluded confine for observation by the doctors Frank has been working with. Frank informs a skeptic Eugene about the special bond the babies have with their parents. Despite seemingly to adjust slightly to society, they take advantage of an opportunity to escape and begin wreaking havoc. While one of the other babies attacks Eugene in the pool, the Scott baby corners Jody with intentions unclear until Frank arrives to defuse the situation. Frank discovers a homing device placed in Jody's purse by her mother before taking the baby to safety. On his way in the woods, Frank is stopped by a night watchman, whose flashlight spooks the previously calm baby, and it attacks and kills Frank in an attempt to escape.

Mallory is revealed to be the father of the monster baby born in Seattle at the end of the original, and convinces a recovering Eugene and Jody his people manage to track Jody to the place in Los Angeles where her baby is taken. The baby also finds them and Jody calms a frightened Eugene as the baby only came to be a part of the family, just as Frank Davis had previously said. However, Mallory enters with the intent to kill the baby, but it attacks him first, forcing Eugene to shoot it to save Mallory's life.

In the last scene, Eugene is seen going up to expectant couples in the street to warn them and offer his help, just as Frank Davis did to him.

Cast 
 Frederic Forrest as Eugene Scott 
 Kathleen Lloyd as Jody Scott 
 John P. Ryan as Frank Davis  
 John Marley as Mr. Mallory  
 Andrew Duggan as Dr. Perry  
 Eddie Constantine as Dr. Forest 
 Bobby Ramsen as Dr. Santo De Silva 
 Glenda Young as Lydia 
 Melissa Inger as Valerie 
 Jill Gatsb as Cindy 
 Lynn Wood as Jody's Mother 
 Dennis O'Flaherty as Dr. Peters 
 James Dixon as Det. Lt. Perkins

Reception
Vincent Canby of The New York Times wrote: "Shot for shot, performance for performance, non-scare for non-scare, 'It Lives Again' surpasses the tackiness of the original, perhaps because the new work has three monster-babies instead of one." A contemporary review published in Variety reads: "Though this is all so much silliness, Cohen effectively uses a good cast topped by Frederic Forrest and Kathleen Lloyd to build up suspense for the growling, slashing attacks by the terrible tykes."

Tom Milne of The Monthly Film Bulletin praised the performances in the film, called the action sequences "sometimes superb," but writing that "the film's ideas, notably the suggestion that the mutants may be nature's answer to the problem of survival in a polluted world, are never really developed." A review published by TV Guide gave the film 3 stars out of 5, reading: "Once again Cohen uses his outrageous premise to explore with insight the fabric of American family life, power structures, and social mores--addressing such topics as corporate abuse of the public trust, abortion, and government omnipotence."

On the review aggregator website Rotten Tomatoes, the film holds an approval rating of 53% based on 15 reviews, with an average score of 4.9 out of 10.

References

External links 

 It Lives Again at AllMovie
 
 It Lives Again at the TCM Movie Database
 It Lives Again at Rotten Tomatoes

1978 films
1978 horror films
1970s monster movies
1970s science fiction horror films
American monster movies
American science fiction horror films
American sequel films
Films about babies
Films directed by Larry Cohen
Films scored by Bernard Herrmann
Films set in the 1970s
Films set in Los Angeles
Warner Bros. films
Films with screenplays by Larry Cohen
1970s English-language films
1970s American films